The Heckler is a satirical sports newspaper created in 2003 by Brad Zibung (born  1976) and George Ellis (born 1977). It is based in Chicago and chronicles the pratfalls of the fabled Chicago Cubs baseball club as well as other major Chicago sports teams and athletes.

The Heckler has received acclaim from the Chicago Reader, The Chicago Sun-Times, Chicago Tribune, Chicago Tonight on WTTW, WFLD's Fox News in the AM, WGN-TV, ESPN Radio Chicago, WSCR, Time Out Chicago and the Sporting News. It has subscribers in 40 states.

In 2006 The Heckler branched beyond the Chicago Cubs and began covering all major Chicago sports.

In March 2007, The Heckler published its first book, The Cubs Fan's Guide to Happiness.

References

External links
 

Newspapers published in Chicago